The Hassayampa River (Yavapai: Hasaya:mvo or ʼHasayamcho:) is an intermittent river, the headwaters of which are just south of Prescott, Arizona, and flows mostly south towards Wickenburg, entering the Gila River near Hassayampa. Although the river has only subsurface flow for much of the year, it has significant perennial flows above ground within the Hassayampa River Canyon Wilderness and the Nature Conservancy's Hassayampa River Preserve, near Wickenburg.

A local legend purports that anyone who drinks from the river can never again tell the truth.  As an anonymous poet wrote:
Those who drink its waters bright –
Red man, white man, boor or knight,
Girls or women, boys or men –
Never tell the truth again

This lush streamside habitat is home to some of the desert's most spectacular wildlife. Yet many of them have become dangerously imperiled as riparian areas have disappeared from the Arizona landscape.
In the Sonoran Desert, riparian areas nourish cottonwood-willow forests, one of the rarest and most threatened forest types in North America. An estimated 90 percent of these critical wet landscapes have been lost, damaged or degraded in the last century. This loss threatens at least 80 percent of Arizona wildlife, which depend upon riparian habitats for survival.

The Hassayampa River was the location of the 1890 Walnut Grove Dam failure, which led to over 100 fatalities along the river.

See also
 List of rivers of Arizona

References

External links
Hassayampa River Preserve at The Nature Conservancy.

Rivers of Arizona
Tributaries of the Gila River
Rivers of Maricopa County, Arizona
Rivers of Yavapai County, Arizona
Prescott National Forest